The 1998–99 Coca-Cola Champions Trophy was a triangular ODI cricket competition held in Sharjah, United Arab Emirates from 6 to 13 November 1998. It featured the national cricket teams of India, Sri Lanka and Zimbabwe. Its official sponsor was Coca-Cola. The tournament was won by India, who defeated Zimbabwe in the final.

Points table

Group stage

1st ODI

2nd ODI

3rd ODI

4th ODI

5th ODI

6th ODI

Final

References

1998 in Indian cricket
Cricket in the United Arab Emirates
1998 in Sri Lankan cricket
1998 in Zimbabwean cricket
One Day International cricket competitions
International cricket competitions from 1997–98 to 2000
1998 in Emirati cricket